The following outline is provided as an overview of and topical guide to Karnataka:

Karnataka is the 6th biggest, 8th most populous, 13th highest and 16th most literate state of the 28 states of the democratic Republic of India. Karnataka is ranked 3rd in the country in tax revenue and 7th in the country in GDP. Karnataka is at 8th position in life expectancy and 11th in female-to-male sex ratio among the states in India. Karnataka is at 7th most media exposed states in India.

General reference

Names 
 Common name: Karnataka
 Previously known as :State of Mysore
 Pronunciation: 
 Official name: Karnāṭaka
 Nicknames: Kannada nādu, Karunādu
 Adjectivals
 Karnataka
 Karnāṭakadavaru/Karnatakan
Canarese
 Demonyms
 Kannadigaru
 Kannadigas
 Canarese
 Abbreviations and name codes
 ISO 3166-2 code: IN-KA
 Vehicle registration code: KA

Rankings (amongst India's states) 

 by population: 8th
 by area: 6th
 by crime rate (2016): 12th
 by gross domestic product (GDP) (2019): 3rd
by Human Development Index (HDI):  18th
by life expectancy at birth: 10th
by literacy rate: 23rd

Geography

Geography of Karnataka

 Karnataka is: an Indian state, a state of the Republic of India.
 Rainfall in Karnataka

Location of Karnataka 
 Karnataka is situated within the following regions:
 Northern Hemisphere
 Eastern Hemisphere
 Eurasia
 Asia
 South Asia
 Indian subcontinent
 India
 South India
 Time zone: Indian Standard Time (UTC+05:30)

The state has three principal geographical zones:
 Karavali
 Malenadu
 Bayaluseeme

East flowing rivers
26 east-flowing rivers.

 Amarja
 Arkavathy River
 Bhadra River
 Chakra River
 Dandavathi
 Ghataprabha River
 Hemavati River
 Honnuhole River
 Kabini River
 Kaveri River
 Kedaka River
 Krishna River
 Kubja River
 Lakshmana Tirtha River
 Malaprabha River
 Palar River
 Panchagangavalli River
 Penner River
 Ponnaiyar River
 Shimsha
 South Pennar River
 Tunga River
 Tungabhadra River
 Varada
 Vedavathi River
 Vrishabhavathi River

West flowing rivers

10 west-flowing rivers, providing 60% of state's inland water resources.
 Gangavalli River
 Aghanashini River
 Kali River
 Kumaradhara River
 Shambhavi River
 Varahi River
 Souparnika River
 Sharavathi River
 Kumadvathi River
 Netravati River
 Gurupura River

Reservoirs 
Alamatti
Linganamakki
Bhadra reservoir
Tungabhadra dam, Hospete
Krishna Raja Sagara
Tippagondanahalli Reservoir
Haringi dam 
Gorur dam.
Kabini dam. 
 Navilatirtha Dam, Saundatti taluka of Belgaum District

Lakes 
Lakes in Bangalore
Mysore city lakes
Unkal lake, Hubli
Fort Lake Belgaum
Heggeri Lake, Haveri
Hagari Jalashaya, Malavi

Administrative divisions

Districts of Karnataka

Districts of Karnataka
There are 30 districts in Karnataka:

Bagalkote
Bengaluru Rural
Bengaluru Urban
Belagavi
Bellary
Bidar
Vijayapura
Chamarajanagar
Chikkaballapur
Chikkamagaluru
Chitradurga
Dakshina Kannada
Davanagere
Dharwad
Gadag
Kalburgi
Hassan
Haveri
Kodagu
Kolar
Koppal
Mandya
Mysuru
Raichur
Ramanagara
Shimoga
Tumakuru
Udupi
Uttara Kannada
Yadgir

Taluks of Karnataka

Taluks of Karnataka

 Afzalpur
 Aland
 Alanvara
 Alur
 Anekal
 Ankola
 Annigeri
 Arkalgud
 Arsikere
 Athani
 Babaleshwar
 Badami
 Bagalkot
 Bagepalli
 Bailahongal
 Bangarapet
 Bantwal
 Basavakalyan
 Basavana Bagevadi
 Belgaum
 Bellary
 Beltangadi
 Belur
 Bengaluru East
 Bengaluru North
 Bengaluru South
 Bhadravati
 Bhalki
 Bhatkal
 Bidar
 Bidar
 Bijapur
 Bilagi
 Brahmavara
 Byadgi
 Baindur
 Chadchan
 Challakere
 Chamrajnagar
 Channagiri
 Channarayapattana
 Chik Ballapur
 Chikmagalur
 Chiknayakanhalli
 Chikodi
 Chincholi
 Chintamani
 Chitapur
 Chitgoppa
 Chitradurga
 Dandeli
 Davanagere
 Devadurga
 Devanhalli
 Devar Hipparagi
 Dharwad
 Doddaballapura
 Gadag-Betigeri
 Gangawati
 Ganjendragad
 Gauribidanur
 Gokak
 Gubbi
 Gudibanda
 Kalaburagi
 Guledgudda
 Gundlupet
 Gurmitkal
 Hagaribommanahalli
 Haliyal
 Hangal
 Hanur
 Harihar
 Harpanahalli
 Hassan
 Haveri
 Heggadadevanakote
 Hirekerur
 Hiriyur
 Holalkere
 Holenarsipur
 Homnabad
 Honavar
 Honnali
 Hoovina Hadagalli
 Hosanagara
 Hosdurga
 Hoskote
 Hospet
 Hubli city
 Hubli
 Hukkeri
 Hulsoor
 Hungund
 Hunsagi
 Hunsur
 Ilkal
 Indi
 Jagalur
 Jamkhandi
 Jevargi
 Joida
 Kadaba
 Kadur
 Kagawad
 Kalghatgi
 kanakapura
 Kamalapura
 Kamalnagar
 Kampli
 Kanakagiri
 Karatagi
 Karkal
 Karwar
 Khanapur
 Kittur
 Kolar
 Kolhar
 Kollegal
 Koppa
 Koppal
 Koratagere
 Kotturu
 Krishnarajanagar
 Krishnarajpet
 Kudligi
 Kukanur
 Kumta
 Kundapura
 Kundgol
 Kunigal
 Kurugodu
 Kushtagi
 Lakshmeshwara
 Lingsugur
 Maddur
 Madhugiri
 Madikeri
 Malavalli
 Malur
 Mandya
 Mangalore
 Manvi
 Maski
 Molakalmuru
 Moodbidri
 Mudalgi
 Muddebihal
 Mudhol
 Mudigere
 Mulbagal
 Mundargi
 Mundgod
 Mysore
 Nagamangala
 Nanjangud
 Narasimharajapura
 Nargund
 Navalgund
 Nelmangala
 Nidagundi
 Nipani
 Nyamati
 Pandavapura
 Pavagada
 Piriyapatna
 Puttur
 Rabkavi Banhatti
 Raichur
 Ramdurg
 Ranibennur
 Raybag
 Ron
 Sagar
 Sakleshpur
 Sanduru
 Saundatti
 Savanur
 Sedam
 Shahabad
 Shahpur
 Shiggaon
 Shikaripura
 Shimoga
 Shirahatti
 Shorapur
 Shrirangapattana
 Siddapur
 Sidlaghatta
 Sindagi
 Sindhnur
 Sira
 Sirsi
 Siruguppa
 Sirwar
 Somvarpet
 Sorab
 Sringeri
 Srinivaspur
 Sulya
 Talikota
 Tarikere
 Tikota
 Tiptur
 Tirthahalli
 Tirumakudalu Narasipura
 Tumkur
 Turuvekere
 Udupi
 Vadagera
 Virajpet
 Yadgir
 Yadrami
 Yelahanka
 Yelandur
 Yelbarga
 Yellapur

Demographics

Demographics of Karnataka
Economy of Karnataka
Religion in Karnataka

Government and politics of Karnataka 

Politics of Karnataka

 Form of government: Indian state government (parliamentary system of representative democracy)
 Capital of Karnataka: Bengaluru
 Elections in Karnataka
 (specific elections)
 Unification of Karnataka

Union government in Karnataka 
 Rajya Sabha members from Karnataka
 Karnataka Pradesh Congress Committee
 Indian general election, 2009 (Karnataka)
 Indian general election, 2014 (Karnataka)

Branches of the government of Karnataka 

Government of Karnataka

Executive branch of the government of Karnataka 

 Head of state: Governor of Karnataka
 Head of government: Chief Minister of Karnataka
 Council of Ministers of Karnataka

Legislative branch of the government of Karnataka 

Karnataka Legislative Assembly
 Constituencies of Karnataka Legislative Assembly

Judicial branch of the government of Karnataka 

 High Court of Karnataka
 Chief Justice of Karnataka

Law and order in Karnataka 

Law of Karnataka
 Law enforcement in Karnataka
 Karnataka Police

History 

History of Karnataka
Political history of medieval Karnataka
Etymology of Karnataka

 Nanda Empire
 Mauryan empire of Emperor Ashoka
 Satavahana
 Kadambas
 Kadamba Dynasty founded by Mayurasharma
 Western Ganga Dynasty 
 Badami Chalukyas
 Rashtrakuta Empire of Manyakheta
 Western Chalukya Empire
 Hoysalas
 Vijayanagara empire
 Nayakas of Chitradurga
 Madakari Nayaka
 Kempegowda
 Moghuls
 architecture 
 literature 
 Literature
 literary metres
 Vesara style of architecture
 Indo-Saracenic
 Battle of Talikota
 Nizam of Hyderabad
 Tippu Sultan
 Ekikarana Movement

Culture

Art and culture of Karnataka

 Carnatic music
 Architecture of Karnataka
 Cuisine of Karnataka
 Kannada people
 Tulu people
 Kodava people
 Beary people
 Konkani people
 Folk arts of Karnataka
 Cinema of Karnataka
Languages
 Kannada language
 Tulu language
 Kodava language
 Konkani language
 Beary language
Dances
 Gubbi Veeranna Nataka Company
 Veeragase
 Kamsale
 Dollu Kunitha
 Bharatanatya
 Dollu Kunitha
 Bhuta Kola
 Yakshagana
 Nagaradhane
 Gaarudi Gombe
 Togalu Gombeyaata
 Veeragase

Symbols of Karnataka 

Symbols of Karnataka
 State animal: Indian Elephant
 State bird: Indian roller
 State flower: Lotus
 State seal: Seal of Karnataka
 State tree: Sandalwood

Tourism

North Karnataka

World heritage centres

 Hampi
 Group of 8th century CE monuments, Pattadakal:
 Historical locations
 Western Chalukya
 Aihole:
 Badami:
 Basavana Bagewadi
 Basavakalyana,
 Bidar District
 Annigeri
 Bankapura
 Dambal
 Haveri
 Gadag
 Lakkundi
  Someshwara temple complex Lakshmeshwar
 Galaganatha Galageshwara temple
 Chaudayyadanapura
 Mahadeva Temple (Itagi)
  Shambulinga Temple Kundgol
 Hooli Panchalingeshwara Temple
 Lakshmeshwar
 Kudalasangama
 Rashtrakuta dynasty
 Malkhed, Kalaburagi district
 Naregal, Gadag District
 Kadamba dynasty
 Halasi
 Hangal
 Banavasi
 Deccan Sultanates
 Bijapur jaws are trying to devour an elephant.
 Bidar:
 Gulbarga
 Raichur
 Lakshmeshwar
 Rattas
 Saundatti
Forts
 Basavakalyan Fort
 Bidar Fort
 Gulbarga Fort
 Savadatti Fort
 Bellary Fort
 Sandur Fort
 Gajendragad
 Nargund fort
 Other
 Sonda
 Ulavi
 Yana
 Utsav Rock Garden, Shiggaon

Coastal Karnataka
 Gokarna
 Mangalore
 Udupi
 Karkala
 Venur
 Malpe Beach
 Panambur Beach
 Kukke Subramanya
 Dharmastala
 Kollur
 Moodabidre
 Bhatkal
 Honnavar
 Ankola
 Murudeshwar
 Karwar

South Karnataka
 Bengaluru
Mysuru
 Belur
 Halebidu
 Arasikere
 Aralaguppe
 Madhugiri
 Sira
 Yediyur
 Madikeri
 Srirangapattana
 Melukote
 Maddur
Nanjanagudu
 Talakadu
 Bhadravathi
 Ikkeri
 Sravanabelgola
 Somnathpur
 Jog Falls
 Mekedatu
 Hesaraghatta
 Shivanasamudram
 Hogenakkal Falls
 Devarayanadurga

See also
Karnataka

 Outline of India
 Kannada
 Kannada people
 Kannada language

References

External links

 Official website of the Government of Karnataka
 

Karnataka-related lists
Karnataka
Karnataka